Southland Academy is a private, co-educational, non-sectarian Christian college preparatory day school in Americus, Georgia, United States. It enrolls over 600 students in grades K through 12, covering ages 4 through 19.  It was founded in 1967 as a segregation academy.

History 
Southland Academy was founded in 1966 as a private school in response to the desegregation of Georgia public schools. In 1979 the public school board (6 of 7 members of which sent their children to Southland) declared many of the district's buses, books and materials to be "surplus", then sold them to  Southland at low prices. The effect of this caused financial hardships for the public schools, thereby promoting the academy. The first classes began in the old Anthony School building on Anthony Drive. In 1970, Southland moved to its current location at 123 Southland Road. It was reported in 1979 that most white parents in the area sent their children to Southland rather than the local public school system, which at the time was 80% black and the subject of boycotts and criticism over alleged neglect and underfunding. One businessman said he would "dig ditches" to earn money to pay tuition at Southland Academy and avoid sending his children to racially integrated public school.

As of the mid-1980s, the Sumter County School District board was all white. School superintendent Ronnie Satterfield and several other board members sent their children to Southland Academy instead of the predominantly black public schools. US president Jimmy Carter referred to the situation as a "disgrace to our state."

Demographics
In 1985, Sumter County was 43% black, but not a single black student was enrolled in Southland Academy.

Southland's racial demographics do not reflect the ethnic makeup of the town of Americus, which is 39.1% White and 58.3% African American, according to the 2000 Census.

As of 2006, Southland Academy's student population is 1% African American, 1% Hispanic, 2% American Indian, and 96% Caucasian. In the 2015–16 school year, 3 of 510 students were black. In the 2017-2018 year, this number had not changed.

Campus
The campus comprises . The main buildings are a 4K building (which combines both 3K and 4K) and a 5K building (which combines both 5K and 1st grade), the elementary building (which includes the main office), junior high (which also includes the cafeteria) and the high school building. Furthermore, the Charles F. Crisp Media and Technology Center has holds two computer labs along with a library. There is also the Jane L. Comer Music Room, the Melvin T. Kinslow gymnatorium, and a lower-school gymnasium. The upper-school gymnasium, which also has a lobby and stage section, doubles as a space for graduation ceremonies and the like. The campus also includes several playing fields - including a football field, a practice football field, and a softball field, among others. There are two playgrounds, one for regular children and a smaller one for the 3K and 4K grades.

Accreditation
The school is accredited by Southern Association of Independent Schools, Southern Association of Colleges and Schools and the Georgia Accrediting Association, and is a member of the Georgia Independent Schools Association (GISA).

Athletics 
Southland Academy has an active athletic program in the GISA in the AAA region. Sports include football, baseball, softball, basketball, wrestling, cross-country running, track and field, golf, swimming, tennis, girls' soccer, and cheerleading. Male teams are called the Southland Raiders; female teams are the Lady Raiders. In 2016, the school added a clay target shooting team.

Class AAA GISA Championships:

 Football: 1986-1987, 1991-1992, 1992-1993
 Baseball: 1982-1983, 1989-1991, 1994-1995, 2003-2004
 Golf:  1980-1988, 1991-1992, 1993-1995, 1997-1998, 2009
 Boys' basketball:  1973-1974, 1975-1977, 1982-1983
 Boys' cross country:  2013-2014, 2014-2015, 2015-2016
 Boys' swimming:  1988-1989, 1991-1992, 1992-1993, 1993-1994, 1995-1996, 1997-1998, 2013-2014, 2014-2015, 2015-2016
 Boys' tennis:  1980-1982, 1982-1984
 Boys' track and field:  1975-1977, 1980-1984, 1991-1992
 Softball: 1976-1977, 1999-2000, 2004-2005, 2006-2007
 Girls' basketball:  1979-1980, 1985-1986
 Girls' swimming:  1988-1989, 1989-1990, 1990-1991, 1991-1992, 1993-1994, 1994-1995
 Girls' track:  1971-1972, 1975-1980, 1989-1990
 Wrestling:  2001-2002

Customs and discipline
A tradition at the school is the annual pageant at which the Miss Southland Academy Raider, better known as Miss SAR, is crowned. The pageant was started in 1989 by "Mothers of Motivated Students," now part of Southland's parent-teacher organization. Its purpose is to generate funds for the Thomas A. Greene Scholarship Fund, which helps Southland students in financial need. Funds also go to the new Madeline Anne Wildes Scholarship Fund.

Southland Academy's discipline policy allows corporal punishment by means of paddling for all boys and young men up to and including grade 12, and for girls up to and including grade 5.

References

External links
 

Private high schools in Georgia (U.S. state)
Educational institutions established in 1966
Schools in Sumter County, Georgia
Private middle schools in Georgia (U.S. state)
Private elementary schools in Georgia (U.S. state)
Segregation academies in Georgia
1966 establishments in Georgia (U.S. state)